Murrel Dean Kirby (born November 21, 1946) is an American politician. He serves as a Republican member of the Mississippi State Senate, where he represents District 30 (Rankin County, Mississippi). He has served in the Mississippi senate since 1992.

References

1946 births
21st-century American politicians
Living people
Mississippi College alumni
Republican Party Mississippi state senators
People from Rankin County, Mississippi
Politicians from Craighead County, Arkansas
Presidents pro tempore of the Mississippi State Senate